Elm is a text-based email client commonly found on Unix systems. First released in 1986, it became popular as one of the first email clients to use a text user interface, and as a utility with freely available source code. The name elm originated from the phrase ELectronic Mail.

Dave Taylor (currently with Intuitive Systems) developed elm while working for Hewlett-Packard. Development later passed to a team of volunteers. The latest public release was version 2.5.8 in August 2005.

Other popular text-based email readers which followed elm and took it as an inspiration include Pine (1989) and Mutt (1995). From about 1995 elm slipped in popularity and functionality, and it now sees relatively little use.

Bill Pemberton of the University of Virginia currently maintains elm.  A former Elm Coordinator was Sydney Weinstein from the Myxa Corporation.

Release history
To get an idea of the period when elm was used and developed, this is a list of major.minor releases, included the last patch level.

 1986-11-30 first release?
 1987-03-08 elm2
 1989-04-12 elm2.2
 1990-12-16 elm-2.3.0
 1993-01-05 elm-2.4
 1996-01-26 elm2.4.25
 1999-03-24 elm2.5.0
 2004-05-21 elm2.5.7
 2005-08-18 elm2.5.8

Unofficial versions
Volunteer developers have forked the Elm code several times, producing modern versions of Elm with fixes and enhancements not in the official development branch. Among the more popular of these distributions are Kari Hurtta's "Millennium Edition" Elm 2.4 ME+ and Elm ME+ 2.5, both of which build upon Michael Elkins' extensions of Elm 2.4.24.

See also
 Comparison of email clients
 Text-based email client

References

External links 
Elm homepage
A comparison of Elm with Mutt
The current official version of Elm (source code tarball)
elm packages on funet.fi
Elm ME+ homepage

Email client software for Linux
Termcap
Software using the BSD license